Magliano di Tenna is a comune (municipality) in the Province of Fermo in the Italian region Marche, located about  south of Ancona and about  north of Ascoli Piceno.

Magliano di Tenna borders the following municipalities: Fermo, Grottazzolina, Montegiorgio, Rapagnano.

Demographic evolution

References

Cities and towns in the Marche